Reijo Hakanen (born August 20, 1943) is a retired professional ice hockey player who played in the SM-liiga for Ilves.  He was born in Kangasala, Finland and inducted into the Finnish Hockey Hall of Fame in 1988.

Hakanen was known for his small size and clean style of play; he never received more than 10 minutes in penalties during a season. He was selected as the Gentlemanary Player of SM-liiga in 1972 and received the Raimo Kilpiö trophy.

External links
Finnish Hockey Hall of Fame bio

Finnish ice hockey forwards
Ilves players
People from Kangasala
1943 births
Living people
KooKoo players
Sportspeople from Pirkanmaa